Sasanian Khwarazm (Middle Persian: Xwarāzm) refers to the period that the ancient civilization of Khwarazm was under the suzerainty of the Sasanian Empire from 242 to its conquest by the nomadic Xionites in c. 350.

References

Sources 
 
 

Khwarazm
240s establishments
States and territories established in the 3rd century
States and territories disestablished in the 4th century